The New Hampshire Department of Corrections is an executive agency of the U.S. state of New Hampshire; charged with overseeing the state correctional facilities, supervising probation and parolees, and serving in an advisory capacity in the prevention of crime and delinquency. As of June 30, 2013, the Department had an inmate population of 2,791, 15,267 on probation or parole, and 893 total employees, 470 as corrections officers and 64 as probation/parole officers. The agency has its headquarters in Concord.

The largest correctional facility in the state is the New Hampshire State Prison for Men in Concord.

Divisions/Units

Administration 

The Division of Administration oversees the business operations for the Department of Corrections.

Commissioner's Office 
The commissioner of the department shall be appointed by the governor, with the consent of the council, and shall serve for a term of 4 years from the date of appointment and until a successor is appointed.  The Commissioner is the chief administrative officer of the department and shall manage all operations of the department and administer and enforce the laws with which he or the department is charged. He shall report directly to the governor.

Adult Parole Board 

The Adult Parole Board is an independent agency that reports directly to the Governor. The board consists of seven members appointed by the Governor and approved by the Executive Council. Members serve five-year terms, and may serve no more than two consecutive terms. By law, three board members must preside over each hearing. The board is part-time, which means that members report for duty only when scheduled for hearings. Board members are always available to issue arrest warrants for parole violators, and to consult with parole officers regarding problem cases.

Correctional Industries 

New Hampshire Correctional Industries is a combination of seven business units, manufacturing goods and providing services to hundreds of government and/or non-profit customers and a growing number of local businesses in New Hampshire. It operates businesses in the agricultural, manufacturing and service related fields. This wide diversity includes printing, graphic solutions, office furniture, home furniture, outdoor furniture, home accessories, firewood, produce, hay, re-upholstery, refinishing, fulfillment services, document and report hosting, a country store, and much more. It is capable of meeting many needs.

Approximately 300 inmates participate in this program each day.

Field Services 

The Division of Field Services supervises New Hampshire offenders who are not currently incarcerated.

Probation - When an individual has been convicted of a misdemeanor or felony and released into the community for supervision
Parole - A legal status whereby an offender convicted of a felony and sentenced to the New Hampshire State Prison is released into the community by the parole board.

Field Services is responsible for the following:

Approximately 4,000 people on probation
Approximately 1,300 people on parole
Approximately 350 people who are released on bail
Approximately 2,700 people who have been ordered to pay restitution to a victim
Approximately 60 individuals on administrative home confinement (sometimes called electronic monitoring or "ankle bracelet")
Approximately 500 people for other types of supervision

Field Services is also responsible for conducting presentencing investigations. These investigations are requested by a court of law. They include a thorough evaluation of the offender's criminal charge, a thorough review of the circumstances including interviews with affected parties, and a recommendation to the sentencing judge.

The Division of Field Services also supervises offenders on probation or parole from other jurisdictions using an interstate compact agreement.

Forensic & Medical Services 

The Division of Forensic and Medical Services is responsible for the provision and coordination of all health and mental health services received by inmates at all facilities operated by the Department of Corrections.

Public Information Office 
The Public Information Office coordinates the release of public information to the public and to the media.

Division of Community Corrections/Transitional Housing 

There are three Transitional Housing Units, formerly called halfway houses, and one Transitional Work Center.
These facilities are operated by the Department of Corrections, Division of Community Corrections and are responsible for providing treatment and services to offenders that are preparing to transition back into the community.

Bureau of Programs 
The Bureau of Programs is responsible for the development and implementation of offender programs geared toward rehabilitation and offender change. Programs include Correctional Counseling/Case Management, the Corrections Special School District (Granite State High School), Family Connections Center, Intervention Services, Parole Violator (PV) Program, Women's Services, Spiritual and Religious Services, and Library Services.

Victim Services 
The New Hampshire Department of Corrections Victim Services Bureau provides services for crime victims and survivors consistent with their needs.

State prison facilities 

The Department of Corrections manages the operations of three secure prison facilities within the state:

See also

 List of law enforcement agencies in New Hampshire
 List of United States state correction agencies
 Prison

References

External links
 

State corrections departments of the United States
Corrections
Corrections
1983 establishments in New Hampshire